Popiel I was a legendary ruler of Poland, member of the Popielids dynasty. According to the legends reported by Wincenty Kadłubek in his Chronica seu originale regum et principum Poloniae, he was the son of Leszko III. Father of Popiel II.

Bibliography 
 Jerzy Strzelczyk: Mity, podania i wierzenia dawnych Słowian. Poznań: Rebis, 2007. .
 Jerzy Strzelczyk: Od Prasłowian do Polaków. Kraków: Krajowa Agencja Wydawnicza, 1987. .

Legendary Polish monarchs